Hüseyin Çelik (born 5 March 1959 in Gürpınar, Van) is a former Minister of National Education of Turkey and member of parliament for Van for the Justice and Development Party (AKP).

Background
Çelik was the first advisor of Recep Tayyip Erdogan and later became the minister of culture and tourism. After that, he became the Minister of National Education. He was the spokesperson of the Turkish Parliament and AKP. Also, in the past, Çelik graduated in Turkish language and literature from Istanbul University in 1983 and went on to a career as an academic at Van Yüzüncü Yıl Üniversitesi, eventually becoming assistant professor in 1997. From 1988-1991 he studied towards a master's degree in politics at the School of Oriental and African Studies in the University of London. His focus was on the late-Ottoman Empire writer and thinker Ali Suavi.

Writer
During the 1990s he wrote a column on Ottoman era politics and other issues for the nationalist-leaning social and political science journal Türkiye Günlüğü. He has published 15 books on politics, culture, history etc. has also edited and annotated an edition of the work "Şinasi" by Ottoman writer Ziyad Ebuzziya.

Political career
He was elected to parliament for Van as a member of Tansu Çiller's DYP in 1999, moving to the newly founded AK Party in 2001. He was elected parliamentary chief and then following the AK Party's election victory in 2002, he became Minister of Culture and then Minister of Education.

During his brief tenure as Minister of Culture he is remembered for immediately sacking the entire Board for the Protection of Culture and Nature. Regional bodies set up to monitor archaeology and other research throughout the country, led by architect and champion of Anatolia's cultural heritage Oktay Ekinci, one of those dismissed. Çelik was then accused of taking this action under pressure from AK Party MP for Muğla Hasan Özyer in order to enable the Muğla coastline to be developed for mass-market tourism.

Minister of Education (2003 - 2009)
As Minister of Education as well as curriculum reform and all the day-to-day running of the school system, Çelik has had to deal with a number of issues including:
 pressure from the European Union to re-open the Greek Orthodox Halki seminary school in Istanbul.
 pressure from graduates and parents, the majority of them AK Party voters, to change the rules that currently limit graduates of the conservative Imam Hatip schools to studying only religious studies at university.
 a number of clashes with the Higher Education Board over issues ranging from the Imam Hatip issue to the appointment and dismissal of individual university rectors.

Personal life
Çelik is of Arab descent on his father's side and of Kurdish descent on his mother's side. He is married to Şahsenem Çelik and they have three children; Ali Ekrem, Enis, and Büşra Vuslat.

References

External links

 Personal Web site

1959 births
Living people
Government ministers of Turkey
Alumni of SOAS University of London
Istanbul University alumni
People from Van, Turkey
Justice and Development Party (Turkey) politicians
Ministers of National Education of Turkey
Ministers of Culture of Turkey
Turkish Kurdish politicians
Turkish Arab people
Members of the 24th Parliament of Turkey
Members of the 23rd Parliament of Turkey
Members of the 22nd Parliament of Turkey
Members of the 21st Parliament of Turkey
Turkish people of Arab descent
Members of the 60th government of Turkey